A Única Mulher (English: Mara - The Only One | Spanish: La Única Mujer) is a Portuguese telenovela broadcast and produced by TVI. It is written by Maria João Mira, author of some of the biggest hits of the channel, and her son André Ramalho. The telenovela premiered on March 15, 2015 and aired at 9 pm (UTC) primetime slot. It was recorded between Lisbon (Portugal) and Luanda (Angola).

The telenovela was the second most watched program in its timeslot. After July, 2015, its ratings started increasing and had the best performance in October, regularly winning its timeslot. Its rising popularity led TVI to announce a second season one month before the ending. This is the first time that a Portuguese telenovela is split into seasons. The second season premiere hit the series' second highest score ever, becoming the most watched tv show in Portugal throughout the season and surpassing its competition. In 2016, the telenovela was renewed once again for a third season.

The debut of the new season in May made similar ratings to the second season, continuing its leading position. TVI is already debating about a possible fourth season.

Note: Each percentage point of rating equals 95,000 viewers. These numbers do not include recorded or delayed viewing, only live views.

Production
The telenovela was first announced in March 2014 by Maria João Mira, whose last telenovela was Doida Por Ti in 2012. By August, the telenovela received its first title, Project Angola, and the first names of the main cast: actresses Alexandra Lencastre, Rita Pereira and international Portuguese model and presenter Ana Sofia Martins. The cast would also be played by African and Brazilian actors. The plot addresses racism, xenophobia and political crisis.

José Eduardo Moniz, advisor of TVI's programs, reveals Angola has one of the main sets of the telenovela, with long-run scenes, along with Portugal. Shooting between two continents was one of the essential parts of the project. Later in November 2014, A Única Mulher was revealed as the official title in an exclusive event.

He was also involved in the concept of the main plot. The project's scale gives it the title of most expensive Portuguese telenovela ever and first to have long-run scenes between two different countries and continents. A Única Mulher started being recorded in November 2014. On March 13, 2015, two days before the premiere, the official launch event was broadcast by TVI.

The promotion of the telenovela started on February 13 and took place on television, web, exteriors, radio, newspapers and magazines and had a huge impact in the audience. Alongside, TVI was also promoting it as a "worldwide premiere", as it was the first Portuguese telenovela to be exported to another country without having debuted in Portugal. The telenovela was also featured in the 22nd anniversary celebrations of TVI.

The first scene of the telenovela begins at a mining site, where the main character Luís Miguel is taken by surprise by an explosion. This scene was recorded in Angola. The episode then rolls back to Portugal and everything is explained until the explosion took place.

Plot

Season 1
The collapse of a great national bank triggers the clash of two realities. And the conflict between two families.

Luís Miguel (Lourenço Ortigão) is a young engineer who seeks to build a career in Angola. He leaves behind a traditional and conservative family, one that has been affected by the crisis. His father, Jorge (José Wallenstein), owns a construction firm in Portugal which is at risk of filing for bankruptcy and his mother, Pilar (Alexandra Lencastre), expects to make money from a broken marriage.

Luís Miguel meets Mara (Ana Sofia Martins) in Angola, the nurse who saves him from near death. The girl’s father, Norberto (Ângelo Torres), is an Angolan businessman who has significant investments in Portugal and he is also the construction firm’s number one client. He holds the company’s fate in his hands but he bears a deep grudge against the Portuguese, since his father was murdered by one during the Colonial war. The legacy of this past and his current interests turn a corporate dispute into a clash of two worlds.

Yet nothing can survive the revenge of one woman. Luena (Rita Pereira) is the daughter of two returnees who lost everything when Angola gained its independence. She wants to get the estate back for her family above all else. Including above herself and her friend Miriam.

Season 2
One year later, Mara and Luís Miguels twin babies take their first steps.

Before dying, Cândida (Laurinda Chiungue) shows Vita (Maura Faial) her birth certificate which reveals that her real mother is still alive and working in Norberto Venâncio'''s house. At first, Neuza (Mina Andala) does not believe in it. Later, she apologizes to her daughter and shows its willingness to be her mother. But Vita is not quite what she seems; along with César (Pêpê Rapazote), pediatrician, the duo arrives to haunt and destabilize the life of Mara and Luís Miguel. Vita starts working as nanny of the twin babies and quietly seduces Luís Miguel. Betrayal is a matter of time...

With her face disfigured and attached to a wheelchair, Pilar does not conform to her life. Apart from having been deceived and robbed by António (Pedro Carmo), Luís Miguel does not forgive how much harm she did to separate him from Mara. The whole family turn their back and she attempts suicide. Her children become worried and Luís Miguel, along with Mara, tries to prevent his mother's madness. In fact, Pilar will not facilitate the live of her children and daughter in law. Leandro (Freddy Costa) is her physiotherapist and will try everything for her to not lose hope of walking again one day, forming an unlikely friendship between her and a black race man, something she despised.

Unable to overcome the death of her fiancé, Sara (Joana de Verona) closes herself in Diogos house and gets drunk every day. Concerned about the follies of his daughter, António recruits Tânia and Radu to follow and watch over her. At that time, Sara and Leandro know each other and the two engage in a romance also unlikely. But the self destructive stage of Sara will destabilize their love.Norberto remains in prison and is threatened and beaten several times. Ramiro, also in the same prison, will try to save the Angolan businessman of problems, but ends up being stabbed. António tries at all costs to end Norberto's life in prison, but one of his hitman is killed and the evidences against Norberto are absolved.

Now out of prison, Norberto promises revenge and will not return alone, joining forces with Pilar to reclaim what was his and end with António's life.

Cast

Children
 Isaac Carvalho - João da Silva - (Júnior)
 Diana Melo - Matilde Caiado João Fernandes - Tomás Caiado Maria Arrais - Joana Fragoso''

Broadcast

Note: the telenovela is also broadcast on TVI's international channel, in over 10 countries.

References

Portuguese telenovelas
Televisão Independente telenovelas
2015 Portuguese television series debuts
2017 Portuguese television series endings
2015 telenovelas
Portuguese-language telenovelas